Hippolytus or Ypolitus was a prelate in the Kingdom of Hungary in the 12th century, who served as Bishop of Vác from around 1156 to 1157, during the reign of Géza II of Hungary.

Career
Hippolytus became Bishop of Vác sometime after 1139, as his last known predecessor, Marcellinus was last mentioned by sources in that year. Hippolytus appears as a witness in two documents. At first in 1156, when Archbishop Martyrius donated the tithe of surrounding 70 villages to the cathedral chapter of Esztergom. Hippolytus again acted in this capacity in March 1157, when Gervasius, Bishop of Győr interceded with Géza II to grant the collection right of salt duties to the archdiocese at Nána and Kakat (present-day Štúrovo, Slovakia). There, Hippolytus was mentioned without his episcopal see.

References

Sources 

 
 

Bishops of Vác
12th-century Hungarian people
Year of birth missing
12th-century Roman Catholic bishops in Hungary